Burraton is a northern suburb of Saltash, Cornwall, England, UK.

References

External links

Populated places in Cornwall